Ciris García (born September 1, 1989) is a Puerto Rican handball player who plays for the club Guadalupe Handball. She is member of the Puerto Rican national team. She competed at the 2015 World Women's Handball Championship in Denmark.

Individual Awards and recognitions
2017 Nor.Ca. Women's Handball Championship: Top scorer
2017 Nor.Ca. Women's Handball Championship: All Star Team Pivot
2017 Caribbean Handball Cup: All Star Team Pivot

References

1989 births
Living people
Puerto Rican female handball players
Place of birth missing (living people)
Handball players at the 2007 Pan American Games
Handball players at the 2011 Pan American Games
Handball players at the 2015 Pan American Games
Handball players at the 2019 Pan American Games
Pan American Games competitors for Puerto Rico
Central American and Caribbean Games silver medalists for Puerto Rico
Competitors at the 2018 Central American and Caribbean Games
Central American and Caribbean Games medalists in handball